Osbaldwick railway station served the village of Osbaldwick, North Yorkshire, England, from 1913 to 1981 on the Derwent Valley Light Railway.

History 
The station opened on 21 July 1913 by the Derwent Valley Light Railway. It closed to passengers on 1 March 1915 and to goods in 1981. Nothing remains.

References

External links 

Disused railway stations in North Yorkshire
Railway stations opened in 1913
Railway stations closed in 1915
1913 establishments in England
1981 disestablishments in England
Railway stations in Great Britain opened in the 20th century